Uttara FC Women are a Bangladeshi women's football club based in Uttara, Dhaka that competes in the Bangladesh Women's Football League, the top flight of women's football in Bangladesh.

History
The Uttara FC Women have played first game against Bashundhara Kings Women on 15 November 2022 at Dhaka which lost by 0–2 goals.

Current squad

Competitive record

Head coach records

Club management

Current technical staff
As of 6 October 2022

References

2022 establishments in Bangladesh
Uttara
Association football clubs established in 2022
Women's football clubs in Bangladesh